A nephrostomy or percutaneous nephrostomy is an artificial opening created between the kidney and the skin which allows for the urinary diversion directly from the upper part of the urinary system (renal pelvis). It is an interventional radiology/surgical procedure in which the renal pelvis is punctured whilst using imaging as guidance. Images are obtained once an antegrade pyelogram (an injection of contrast), with a fine needle, has been performed. A nephrostomy tube may then be placed to allow drainage.

An urostomy is a related procedure performed more distally along the urinary system to provide urinary diversion.

Uses
A nephrostomy is performed whenever a blockage keeps urine from passing from the kidneys, through the ureter and into the urinary bladder. Without another way for urine to drain, pressure would rise within the urinary system and the kidneys would be damaged.

The most common cause of blockage necessitating a nephrostomy is cancer, especially ovarian cancer and colon cancer. Nephrostomies may also be required to treat pyonephrosis, hydronephrosis and kidney stones.

Diagnosis
Percutaneous nephrostomy is used in Whitaker test to differentiate recurrent obstruction or permanent dilatation after an operative surgery that corrects the cause of obstruction. This procedure is also used for antegrade pyelography to visualize the upper urinary tract system.

Treatment
Percutaneous nephrostomy is also used to treat hydronephrosis caused by kidney stones, pregnancy, stricture of the urinary tract, urinary tract/cervical/prostate tumours. Besides, infections such as urosepsis and pyonephrosis can also be drained by nephrostomy tube insertion. Percutaneous nephrostomy is also useful in divert urine away from diseased site to enhance healing. Examples of conditions that can be treated with such method are malignant/traumatic/inflammatory fistula, and haemorrhagic cystitis.

Percutaneous nephrostomy is also used to provide access for chemotherapy/antibiotic/antifungal therapy, antegrade urethral stent placement, stone retrieval, and endopyelotomy (endoscopic surgery for the enlargement of the junction of renal pelvis and ureter).

Process

Nephrostomies are created either by surgeons or interventional radiologists.

Under interventional radiology, the subject either lies down on the side or in a prone position. An area is selected below the 12th rib, bounded laterally by the posterior axillary line and the muscles of the spine and from below by the pelvic bone. The exact area is then located by ultrasound. Local anesthetic infiltration is used to numb the area. Then a needle would pass through to make the puncture on the kidney. Then, urine from the kidney is aspirated and check for its contents. If the urine is clear, dye will be injected to delineate the renal pelvis and renal calyx. If the urine is turbid, it means the urine is infected. Dye injection is avoided in case of turbid urine to prevent the spread of infection to other parts of the urinary system. Then, a guidewire is inserted into the through the needle and parked within the upper renal calyx or within the ureter under fluoroscopy guidance. Then the puncture tract is dilated using a dilator. Various types of catheters such as pigtail catheter or Malecot catheter (a catheter that has a special mechanism for preventing blockage in case of thick pus in pyonephrosis and not easily dislodged when compared to pigtail catheter) can be used. The catheter is inserted through the guidewire and is secured in place by suturing it to the skin. The other end of the catheter is attached to a urine bag for drainage of urine from the kidney.

Risks
Percutaneous nephrostomy is overall a very safe procedure. Risks and complications include:
 Malposition
 Intra-peritoneal leakage, causing ascites
 Hemorrhage
 Infection. This can generally be treated with antibiotics.

Although pneumothorax and colonic injury are more common on subcostal needle insertion, these are rare complications.

Blood in urine usually clears up after 48 to 72 hours. Bleeding longer than this period may signifies more serious bleeding complication. About 2 to 4% of percutaneous nephrostomy cases require blood transfusion.

See also 
 Interventional radiology
 List of surgeries by type

References

External links
 Cardiovascular and Interventional Radiological Society of Europe

Urologic surgery
Interventional radiology
Nephrology